Hans Steinke (February 22, 1893 – June 26, 1971) was a German professional wrestler and actor. He appeared in the films Deception, Island of Lost Souls, People Will Talk, Nothing Sacred and The Buccaneer.

He died of lung cancer on June 26, 1971, in Chicago, Illinois at age 78.

References

External links
 

1893 births
1971 deaths
Sportspeople from Berlin
German male professional wrestlers
Male actors from Berlin
20th-century German male actors
German male film actors
Deaths from lung cancer